The 1972–73 Scottish Inter-District Championship was a rugby union competition for Scotland's district teams.

This season saw the 20th Scottish Inter-District Championship.

Edinburgh District and Glasgow District shared the competition with 2 wins and 1 loss.

North and Midlands beat South of Scotland for the first time since 1958.

1972-73 League Table

Results

Round 1

Glasgow District: 

North and Midlands:

Round 2

South of Scotland:

Edinburgh District:

Round 3

Edinburgh District:

Glasgow District: 

South of Scotland: 

North and Midlands:

Round 4

North and Midlands: 

Edinburgh District:

Round 5

South of Scotland: 

Glasgow District:

Matches outwith the Championship

Other Scottish matches

Trial matches

Probables: 

Possibles:

English matches

International matches

References

1972–73 in Scottish rugby union
Scottish Inter-District Championship seasons